Héctor Berra (23 September 1909 – 4 November 1977) was an Argentine track and field athlete. He competed in the 100 metres, long jump and the decathlon at the 1932 Summer Olympics. He  reached the finals in long jump and finished in the seventh position with a 6.66 meters jump.

Aside from his participation in the Olympic Games, Héctor participated in the South American Championships in Athletics representing Argentina in 1929, 1931, 1933 and 1937. He won 3 straight championships with the national team (1929/1931/1933), and 4 gold medals (decathlon in 1929/1931, and long jump in 1931/1933), one silver medal (shot put in 1937) and broke three South American records in the process (long jump in 1931/1933, and decathlon in 1931). His South American record in decathlon remained unmatched until the 1975 South American Championships in Athletics when his Argentine compatriot Tito Steiner won his first gold medal.

References

1909 births
1977 deaths
Athletes from Buenos Aires
Argentine male sprinters
Argentine male long jumpers
Argentine decathletes
Olympic athletes of Argentina
Athletes (track and field) at the 1932 Summer Olympics
20th-century Argentine people